Martin Paul "Marty" Atkins (born 4 May 1969) is a former Australian rules footballer who played for  in the West Australian Football League (WAFL). Atkins holds the record for the most WAFL matches played for South Fremantle.

Early life
Atkins was born in London, England and arrived in Australia as a teenager. He attended Kwinana Senior High School.

Playing career

Junior football
Atkins began playing for Kwinana at under-16 level. Making an impression as a ruckman, Atkins twice tied for club best and fairest player award, ultimately losing both times on countback.

South Fremantle
After making his WAFL league debut in 1989, he played 266 times for the Bulldogs including the 1997 premiership.

In July 2003 Atkins overtook Tom Grljusich as the South Fremantle games record holder.

Donnybrook
In 2004 Atkins joined Donnybrook in the South West Football League (SWFL) where he made an immediate impact, finishing the season as runner-up for the Hayward Medal, the league's award for best and fairest player. Between 2004 and 2007, Atkins played 65 times for the Dons.

Wesley-Curtin
Atkins was appointed playing coach of Wesley-Curtin in the Western Australian Amateur Football League (WAAFL) for the 2008 season. His form in 2009 was rewarded when he won the CJ Jamieson Medal as the best and fairest player in the WAAFL. He played until the 2010 season when he retired mid-season.

State football
Atkins played five matches for Western Australia, making his debut in 1992 against South Australia. He was awarded the Simpson Medal as best player in the 1993 clash with South Australia.

Working life
In 1988 Atkins joined Western Australia Police. He spent time based in Wyalkatchem and Trayning, towns over 200 km from Perth. He returned to Kwinana Senior High School for a three-year posting as school police officer. After 15 years, Atkins left the police in 2003 to take up a role with South Fremantle as football manager. He later joined  as football operations manager. In early 2012 he joined  as CEO.

Notes

References

1969 births
Living people
South Fremantle Football Club players
South Fremantle Football Club administrators
Perth Football Club administrators
Peel Thunder Football Club administrators
English players of Australian rules football